The 2022 División Profesional season (officially the Copa de Primera TIGO-Visión Banco 2022 for sponsorship reasons) was the 88th season of the Paraguayan Primera División, the top-flight professional football league in Paraguay. The season began on 4 February and ended on 13 November 2022. The fixtures for the season were announced on 14 December 2021.

In the Torneo Apertura Libertad won their twenty-second league championship, clinching the title with one match in hand after beating Cerro Porteño by a 1–0 score on 25 June, whilst the Torneo Clausura was won by Olimpia, who claimed their forty-sixth league title after drawing 1–1 with Nacional on the last matchday played on 12 November. Cerro Porteño were the defending champions, having won the 2021 Clausura tournament.

Teams
Twelve teams competed in the season: the top eight teams in the relegation table of the 2021 season, the top three teams in the 2021 Paraguayan División Intermedia (General Caballero (JLM), Resistencia, and Tacuary), as well as Sportivo Ameliano, winners of the promotion/relegation play-off. The promoted teams replaced River Plate and Sportivo Luqueño, who were relegated to the second tier at the end of the previous season.

Stadia and locations

Notes

Managerial changes

Notes

Torneo Apertura
The Campeonato de Apertura, named "Homenaje a Luis Alberto Pettengill Castillo", was the 125th official championship of the Primera División and the first championship of the 2022 season. It started on 4 February and ended on 3 July.

Standings

Results

Top scorers

Source: Soccerway

Torneo Clausura
The Campeonato de Clausura, named "Homenaje to Alexandro Arce Añazco", was the 126th official championship of the Primera División and the second championship of the 2022 season. It began on 14 July and ended on 13 November.

Standings

Results

Top scorers

Source: Soccerway

Aggregate table

Relegation
Relegation was determined at the end of the season by computing an average of the number of points earned per game over the past three seasons. The two teams with the lowest average were relegated to the División Intermedia for the following season.

 Source: APF

Season awards
On 14 November 2022 a ceremony was held at the Sheraton Hotel in Asunción to announce the winners of the season awards (Premios de Primera), who were chosen based on voting by the managers of the 12 Primera División teams, local sports journalists, the APF's Referee Commission, the public as well as official statistics.

See also
2022 Copa Paraguay
2022 Paraguayan División Intermedia

References

External links
APF's official website 

Paraguay
Paraguayan Primera División seasons
2022 in Paraguayan football